Shanique Davis Speight (born November 14, 1978) is an American politician of the Democratic Party serving as the State Representative for the 29th Legislative District in the New Jersey General Assembly since 2018, replacing Blonnie R. Watson, who chose not to run for reelection. Speight has served in the Assembly as the Deputy Parliamentarian since 2022.

Speight served briefly on the Municipal Council of Newark after being nominated by then-Mayor Cory Booker in November 2012 to fill a vacant seat, but was forced to vacate the seat the following month after a judge ruled that Booker lacked the authority to cast a vote given the circumstances.

Early life and education
A resident of Newark, Speight graduated from Lincoln University with a Master of Arts in Human Services. An officer in the Essex County Sheriff's Office, Speight was first elected to the Newark Public Schools Advisory Board in 2007, and served as the board's vice chair from 2007 to 2012. She was an aide to Senator Teresa Ruiz from 2009 to 2010.

Political career
After Donald Payne Jr. vacated his at-large seat on the Newark City Council after being elected to succeed his father in Congress, Speight was nominated by Mayor Cory Booker at a contentious November 2012 council meeting and sworn in to fill Payne's vacant seat, resulting in what The Star-Ledger described as a "near-riot". After the nomination, residents charged the sitting council members and Speight was knocked down. In December 2012, a New Jersey Superior Court judge ruled that Booker did not have the power to cast a deciding vote under the circumstances that prevailed at the meeting in question, forcing Speight to vacate the seat. In July 2013, the New Jersey Superior Court, Appellate Division affirmed the decision that Booker did not have the authority to vote to nominate Speight; a special election to fill the vacant seat was to be held in November 2013, with the council left in a four-four deadlock on the nine-member council until the seat would be filled.

New Jersey General Assembly
In the November 2017 general election, with Blonnie Watson not seeking re-election, Speight (with 18,308 votes; 43.0% of all ballots cast) and her running mate, incumbent Eliana Pintor Marin (with 19,088; 44.8%), defeated Republican challengers Charles G. Hood (2,622; 6.2%) and Jeannette Veras (2,574; 6.0%) to win both Assembly seats from the district for the Democrats.

Committees 
Committee assignments for the current session are:
Homeland Security and State Preparedness, Chair
Health
Aging and Senior Services

District 29 
Each of the 40 districts in the New Jersey Legislature has one representative in the New Jersey Senate and two members in the New Jersey General Assembly. The representatives from the 29th District for the 2022—23 Legislative Session are:
 Senator Teresa Ruiz  (D)
 Assemblywoman Eliana Pintor Marin  (D)
 Assemblywoman Shanique Speight  (D)

References

External links
Legislative website

1978 births
Living people
Lincoln University (Pennsylvania) alumni
Democratic Party members of the New Jersey General Assembly
Members of the Municipal Council of Newark
Politicians from Newark, New Jersey
School board members in New Jersey
Women state legislators in New Jersey
21st-century American politicians
Women city councillors in New Jersey
21st-century American women politicians